The Kurrent is a neighborhood electric vehicle that was built between 2006 and 2007 by the now defunct American Electric Motor Vehicle Company.

Features
The Kurrent has a 4.1 kW electrical motor powered by four 12 volt lead–gel sealed batteries (total 48 volts). Charge time from a 120 V outlet is approximately 8 hours. It featured regenerative brakes, a lockable 7.5 cubic foot trunk and a separate 12 volt battery to power optional equipment.

Concept
The Kurrent's design was based on the European line of microcars (which were inspired by motorcycles). They were built in Wixom, Michigan.

Production of the Kurrent stopped in 2007, and the American Electric Motor Vehicle Company ceased operations in 2008.

External links
ev-info.com
YouTube video about the Kurrent

References

Electric car models
Low-speed vehicles